Unnatural Death is a 1927 mystery novel by Dorothy L. Sayers, her third featuring Lord Peter Wimsey.  It was published under the title The Dawson Pedigree in the United States in 1928.

Plot
Lord Peter Wimsey and his friend Chief Inspector Parker are told about the death, in late 1925, of an elderly woman named Agatha Dawson who had been suffering from terminal cancer. She was being cared for by Mary Whittaker, her great-niece and a trained nurse. Miss Dawson had an extreme aversion to making a will, believing that Miss Whittaker, her only known relative, would naturally inherit everything. Wimsey is intrigued in spite of the fact that there is no evidence of any crime (a post-mortem found no sign of foul play), nor any apparent motive (on Miss Dawson's death her estate did indeed pass, as she had expected and wished, to her great-niece).

Wimsey sends his private investigator, Miss Katharine Climpson, to the village of Leahampton to investigate. She discovers that shortly before her death Miss Dawson had dismissed her maids, the sisters Bertha and Evelyn Gotobed. Wimsey places advertisements in the press asking them to get in touch. A few days later, Bertha is found dead in Epping Forest. On the body is a £5 banknote, originally issued to a Mrs Muriel Forrest who lives in an elegant flat in South Audley Street, Mayfair. Wimsey and Parker visit her. She claims not to remember the banknote, but thinks she may have put it on a horse. Wimsey tricks her into providing her fingerprints on a wineglass. In a drawer he finds a hypodermic syringe with a doctor's prescription "to be injected when the pain is very severe".

Evelyn Gotobed tells Wimsey of an episode shortly before the sisters were dismissed in which Miss Whittaker had tried to get them to witness Miss Dawson's will, without the latter's knowledge. A mysterious West Indian clergyman named Hallelujah Dawson had also turned up, claiming to be an impecunious distant relative.

Mrs Forrest asks Wimsey to visit her at her flat in London where she clumsily makes advances to him. Wimsey suspects blackmail. He kisses her and realises that she is physically revolted by his caress. 

Wimsey discovers a motive for Miss Dawson to be killed before the end of 1925: a new 'Property Act' coming into force on 1 January 1926 will change the law of inheritance, resulting in an intestate's property no longer passing to a closest-relative great-niece but being forfeit to the Crown. Much play is made of a fictionalised uncertainty in the meaning of the word "issue".

Mary Whittaker – who Miss Climpson has concluded "is not of the marrying sort" – disappears from Leahampton along with Vera Findlater, an impressionable young woman who is besotted with her. Several days later Miss Findlater's body is found on the downs, apparently killed by a blow to the head. Mary Whittaker has it seems been kidnapped. There are indications that the culprit is a black man, and a distinctive cap found nearby is linked to Hallelujah Dawson. However, a post-mortem finds that Vera Findlater was already dead when she was struck, and Wimsey realises that the whole scene has been faked in order to frame the entirely innocent clergyman.  Tyre tracks from Mrs Forrest's car are found nearby, and Wimsey suspects her and Mary Whittaker of acting in collusion.

Wimsey's manservant, Bunter, realises that the fingerprints on Mrs Forrest's wineglass are identical to those on a cheque written by Miss Whittaker. Wimsey at last understands that Muriel Forrest and Mary Whittaker are one and the same person, and that she carried out the murders by injecting air into her victims' bloodstream with a hypodermic syringe, causing blockage and immediate death through heart failure. Meanwhile Miss Climpson, unable to contact Wimsey, heads to South Audley Street where she is attacked by Mary Whittaker. Wimsey and Parker arrive just in time to save Miss Climpson from becoming the final victim. Whittaker is arrested, and commits suicide in prison.

Characters
Lord Peter Wimsey – protagonist, aristocratic amateur detective
Detective-Inspector Charles Parker – Wimsey's friend
Mervyn Bunter – Wimsey's manservant
Miss Alexandra Katherine Climpson – enquiry agent employed by Wimsey
Miss Agatha Dawson (deceased) – wealthy woman who died suddenly some time before the book opens
Miss Mary Whittaker – Miss Dawson's great-niece
Dr Carr – Miss Dawson's doctor
Miss Vera Findlater – friend and besotted admirer of Miss Whittaker
Miss Philliter – former nurse of Miss Dawson, engaged to Dr Carr
Bertha and Evelyn Gotobed – former servants of Miss Dawson
Rev Hallelujah Dawson – impoverished West Indian clergyman and distant cousin of Miss Dawson
Mr Murbles – solicitor and friend of Wimsey
Mrs Muriel Forrest – fashionable lady living in London

Literary significance and criticism

According to James Brabazon in his Dorothy L Sayers: a biography (1981), Sayers drew her ingenious (and medically doubtful) murder method from her familiarity with motor engines, gained from her affair with a car mechanic and motor-bike enthusiast.

In their review of Crime novels (revised edn 1989), the US writers Barzun and Taylor stated that "The tale is perhaps a little forced in conception and remote in tone.  That is the trouble with all the great masters – they accustom us to such dazzling performances that when they give us what would seem wonderful coming from other hands, we sniff and act choosy.  The mode of compassing death has been carped at, but no one could do anything but rejoice at Miss Climpson and her subterfuges."

HRF Keating, writing in 1989, noted that Sayers had "invented a murder method that is appropriately dramatic and cunningly ingenious, the injection of an air-bubble with a hypodermic". However, "not only would it require the use of an instrument so large as to be farcical, but Miss Sayers has her bubble put into an artery not a vein.  No wonder afterwards she pledged herself 'strictly in future to seeing I never write a book which I know to be careless'."

Themes and treatment
In Murder in the Closet: Essays on Queer Clues in Crime Fiction before Stonewall (2017), Noah Stewart described Mary Whitaker as being "to my knowledge the most clearly delineated homosexual character in Golden Age detective fiction, despite the word 'lesbian' never being used, and she's depicted as enticing a young girl into a life of homosexuality". The episode in which Mary Whittaker is kissed by Wimsey is "the closest that a writer in 1927 would be able to come to saying that a character was a lesbian and that kissing a man made her want to vomit." Laura Vorachek argued that, in the novel, "Sayers attempts to challenge the prevalent cultural associations of blackness and criminality."

Legal background
On 1 January 1926, the date specified by Sayers, two important property statutes came into force in England: the Law of Property Act 1925 and the Administration of Estates Act 1925. The latter, corresponding most closely with the ‘Property Act’ of the novel, swept away the old rules on intestacy and specified by way of a six-point list the persons who would inherit if the intestate left neither issue nor parents. If the deceased had no surviving relatives of the classes mentioned (which did not include great-niece), the estate would go to the Crown.

Adaptations
In May 1975, an adaptation was made for BBC Radio 4, produced by Simon Brett and starring Ian Carmichael as Lord Peter Wimsey.

References

External links
 
 

1927 British novels
Novels by Dorothy L. Sayers
British mystery novels
Novels set in Hampshire
Novels set in London
Novels set in the 1920s
Novels adapted into radio programs
Ernest Benn Limited books